Eachankottai is a village in the Orathanadu taluk of Thanjavur district, Tamil Nadu, India.

Demographics 

As per the 2001 census, Eachankottai had a total population of 2184 with 1105 males and 1079 females. The sex ratio was 976. The literacy rate was 68.2.

References 

 

Villages in Thanjavur district